Pachymasiphis is a genus of mites in the family Ologamasidae.

Species
 Pachymasiphis maior Karg, 1996
 Pachymasiphis porulatus Karg, 1996

References

Rhodacaridae